The calculation of radiation dose from radioactive seeds is crucial in the planning and administration of brachytherapy treatments.  Most modern calculation are done using the formalism published by the American Association of Physicists in Medicine.  For the geometry in figure 1, this formalism uses five parameters.
The equation which links these parameters is,

References

Radioactivity
Medical physics